

Introduction 

Parkside Elementary School is a K-6th grade school located in Murray, Utah. It is a part of the Murray School District. The school's principal is Dr. Brian Dawes.

Fun Facts 
Founded = 1969

Grades = K-6

Enrollment = 616

Colors = Blue and white

Mascot = Panthers

Chess Club Founded = 2013

Chess Club Founded by = Nils Larson, Nathan Fetzer, and Samuel Powell

Notable alumni 

 Cody Giles

 Andrew Buck Corser
 Elisabeth Johnson
 Nils Larson
 Dustin Matsumori
 Olivia Shelton
 Brek

External links 
 Official website

Public elementary schools in Utah
Buildings and structures in Murray, Utah
Schools in Salt Lake County, Utah